Muellerargia is a genus of flowering plants belonging to the family Cucurbitaceae.

Its native range is Madagascar, and southern and eastern Malesia to northern Australia. It is found in Christmas Island, Java, Lesser Sunda Islands, Madagascar, Maluku Islands, New Guinea, Queensland, Sulawesi and Western Australia.

The genus name of Muellerargia is in honour of Johannes Müller Argoviensis (1828–1896), a Swiss botanist who was a specialist in lichens. 
It was first described and published in A.L.P.P.de Candolle & A.C.P.de Candolle, Monogr. Phan. Vol.3 on page 630 in 1881.

Species
According to Kew:
Muellerargia jeffreyana  – Madagascar
Muellerargia timorensis  – Java, Bali, Christmas Island, Wallacea, New Guinea, Queensland, Western Australia.

References

Cucurbitaceae
Cucurbitaceae genera
Plants described in 1881
Flora of Madagascar
Flora of Malesia
Flora of New Guinea
Flora of Queensland
Flora of Western Australia
Taxa named by Alfred Cogniaux